Lost Creek is a stream located entirely within Miami County, Ohio.

According to tradition, Lost Creek was named for an Indian who was lost there.

See also
List of rivers of Ohio

References

Rivers of Miami County, Ohio
Rivers of Ohio